The 2016 Asia Rugby Championship, or ARC, was the second annual tri-nations series for top-level rugby union in Asia and the twenty-ninth continental championship for the Asia Rugby nations. The Asia Rugby Championship replaced the former Asian Five Nations in 2015, with only three nations competing in the top division instead of the previous five. The 2016 series included Hong Kong, Japan and South Korea. Other Asian nations competed in the lower division tournaments.

The format of the competition is a double round-robin where the top-three nations play each other twice on a home and away basis. The team finishing on top of the standings is declared the winner, and the bottom-placed team is subject to a promotion-relegation play-off against the winner of Division 1, although this opportunity to challenge is often declined.

Teams
The teams involved, with their world rankings prior to the 2016 tournament in brackets:

Standings

Fixtures

Week 1

Week 2

Week 3

Week 4

Week 5

Week 6

Top 3 Challenge
Division 1 winners, Malaysia did not choose to participate in the promotion-relegation play-off. Meaning the composition of next series of the tournament remains the same.

See also
 2016 Asia Rugby Championship division tournaments

References

2016 rugby union tournaments for national teams
2016 in Asian rugby union
2016
International rugby union competitions hosted by Hong Kong
International rugby union competitions hosted by South Korea
International rugby union competitions hosted by Japan
2015–16 in Japanese rugby union
rugby union
rugby union